Rock et Belles Oreilles (RBO) was a Canadian radio, television and stage comedy group that was very popular in the primarily French-speaking Canadian province of Quebec during the 1980s and 1990s. Its name was a pun on the name of the famous Hanna-Barbera blue dog character Huckleberry Hound ("Roquet Belles Oreilles" in French).

The group was formed in 1981, with the original lineup consisting of Guy A. Lepage, Yves P. Pelletier, Bruno E. Landry, André G. Ducharme, Richard Z. Sirois and Chantal Francke. Sirois left the group in 1987, and Francke left in 1992. The group separated in 1995.

References

External links
 Official website 

Comedians from Quebec
Television shows filmed in Quebec
1980s Canadian sketch comedy television series
Noovo original programming
Canadian comedy troupes
Year of Canadian television series debut missing
Year of Canadian television series ending missing
Audiogram (label) artists
Comedy collectives
1990s Canadian sketch comedy television series